HD 50499 is a star in the constellation of constellation of Puppis. With an apparent visual magnitude of 7.21, this star is too faint to be in naked eye visibility. It is located at a distance of 151 light years from the Sun based on parallax, and is drifting further away with a radial velocity of +36.7 km/s.

This object is a G-type main-sequence star with a stellar classification of G0/2 V. It is positioned 0.6 magnitudes above the main sequence, which may be explained by a high metallicity and an older age. Vogt et al. (2005) estimated its age as about 6.2 billion years, although more recent estimates give a younger age of around 2.4 billion years. The star has 1.31 times the mass of the Sun and 1.42 times the Sun's radius. It is radiating 2.38 times the luminosity of the Sun from its photosphere at an effective temperature of 6,099 K. As of 2005, at least one extrasolar planet has been confirmed to be orbiting the star.

Planetary system 

The first planet discovered, HD 50499 b, is a gas giant with mass of 1.7 times Jupiter. It is a long period, taking 351 weeks to orbit the star. The planet's eccentric orbit passes through the average distance of 574 Gm or 18.6 μpc.

The planet was discovered by four team members including Steven Vogt in 2005 using their radial velocity method, which used to measure changes in red- and blue-shifting of the star that indicate the presence of planets caused by gravitational tug. There is also a linear trend in the radial velocities, which may indicate an additional outer planet. The best two-planet model gives a different period and mass for the inner planet (9.8 years and 3.4 Jupiter masses), with an outer planet of 2.1 Jupiter masses in a 37-year orbit. However the two-planet model does not represent a significant improvement over the model with one planet and a linear trend, so more observations are needed to constrain the parameters of the outer planet.

Rickman et al. (2019) gave updated models of the planets and their orbits, shown below. HD 50499c is listed as a confirmed planet as of 2020.

See also 
 HD 50554

References 

G-type main-sequence stars
Planetary systems with two confirmed planets
Puppis
Durchmusterung objects
050499
032970